An unmanned surface vehicle (USV), also known as unmanned surface vessel, autonomous surface vehicle (ASV) in some cases, uncrewed surface vessel (USV), or, colloquially, a drone ship, or robot boat, is a boat or ship that operates on the surface of the water without a crew. USVs operate with various levels of autonomy, from remote control to fully autonomous. 

Some commercial USVs may utilize COLREGs-compliant navigation.

USVs were used militarily as early as World War II for remote controlled target craft and minesweeper purposes, they are becoming more widely used in the twenty-first century for a range of purposes including oceanography and environmental monitoring, as well as cargo transport,  and military applications. Various other applications are also being explored. In October 2022 during the Russian invasion of Ukraine Ukraine armed forces used 7 USVs and 8 UAVs in an attack on multiple Russian naval vessels at the Sevastopol Naval Base. According to Naval News, this represents the first use of unmanned surface vehicles in naval warfare.

Regulatory environment 
The regulatory environment for USV operations is changing rapidly as the technology develops and is more frequently deployed on commercial projects. The Maritime Autonomous Surface Ship UK Industry Conduct Principles and Code of Practice 2020 (V4) has been prepared by the UK Maritime Autonomous Systems Regulatory Working Group (MASRWG) and published by Maritime UK through the Society of Maritime Industries. Organisations that contributed to the development of the MASS Code of Practice include The Maritime & Coastguard Agency (MCA), Atlas Elektronik UK Ltd, AutoNaut, Fugro, the UK Chamber of Shipping, UKHO, Trinity House, Nautical Institute, National Oceanography Centre, Dynautics Limited, SEA-KIT International, Sagar Defence Engineering and many more.

In July 2021, SEA-KIT International became the first USV designer and builder to receive Unmanned Marine Systems (UMS) certification from Lloyd's Register for its 12m X-class USV design. USV Maxlimer is SEA-KIT's proof of concept X-class vessel, based at their headquarters in Tollesbury, Essex.

By the end of 2017, Sagar Defence Engineering became the first company in India to build and supply USV to a Government organization.

Development
As early as the end of World War II, remote-controlled USVs were used by the US Navy for target drone and minesweeping applications. In the twenty-first century, advances in USV control systems and navigation technologies have resulted in USVs that an operator can control remotely from land or a nearby vessel: USVs that operate with partially autonomous control, and USVs (ASVs) that operate fully autonomously. Modern applications and research areas for USVs and ASVs include commercial shipping, environmental and climate monitoring, seafloor mapping, passenger ferries, robotic research, surveillance, inspection of bridges and other infrastructure, military, and naval operations.

On January 17, 2022, the Soleil succeeded in completing the first fully autonomous sea voyage by ship. Built by MHI, the demonstration was conducted in cooperation of Shin Nihonkai Ferry. The seven-hour, 240-kilometre voyage, from Shinmoji in Northern Kyushu to the Iyonada Sea, recorded a maximum speed of 26 knots.

In August 2022, the MV Mikage of the Mitsui O.S.K. Lines sailed 161-nautical miles over two days, from Tsuruga to Sakai, successfully completing the first crewless sea voyage to include docking of an autonomous coastal container ship, in a two-day trial.

USV autonomy platforms
A number of autonomy platforms (computer software) tailored specifically for USV operations have been developed. Some are tied to specific vessels, while others are flexible and can be applied to different hull, mechanical, and electrical configurations.

Computer-controlled and operated USVs
The design and build of uncrewed surface vessels (USVs) is complex and challenging. Hundreds of decisions relating to mission goals, payload requirements, power budget, hull design, communication systems and propulsion control and management need to be analysed and implemented. Crewed vessel builders often rely on single-source suppliers for propulsion and instrumentation to help the crew control the vessel. In the case of an uncrewed (or partially crewed) vessel, the builder needs to replace elements of the human interface with a remote human interface.

Technical considerations 
Uncrewed surface vessels vary in size from under 1 metre LOA to 20+ metres, with displacements ranging from a few kilograms to many tonnes, so propulsion systems cover a wide range of power levels, interfaces and technologies.

Interface types (broadly) in order of size/power:

 PWM-controlled Electronic Speed Controllers for simple electric motors
 Serial bus, using ASCII-coded commands
 Serial bus using binary protocols
 Analogue interfaces found on many larger vessel
 Proprietary CANbus protocols used by various engine manufacturers
 Proprietary CANbus protocols used by manufacturers of generic engine controls

While many of these protocols carry demands to the propulsion, most of them do not bring back any status information. Feedback of achieved RPM may come from tacho pulses or from built-in sensors that generate CAN or serial data. Other sensors may be fitted, such as current sensing on electric motors, which can give an indication of power delivered. Safety is a critical concern, especially at high power levels, but even a small propeller can cause damage or injury and the control system needs to be designed with this in mind. This is particularly important in handover protocols for optionally manned boats.

A frequent challenge faced in the control of USVs is the achievement of a smooth response from full astern to full ahead. Crewed vessels usually have a detent behaviour, with a wide deadband around the stop position. To achieve accurate control of differential steering, the control system needs to compensate for this deadband. Internal combustion engines tend to drive through a gearbox, with an inevitable sudden change when the gearbox engages which the control system must take into account. Waterjets are the exception to this, as they adjust smoothly through the zero point. Electric drives often have a similar deadband built in, so again the control system needs to be designed to preserve this behaviour for a man on board, but smooth it out for automatic control, e.g., for low-speed manoeuvring and Dynamic Positioning.

Oceanography, hydrography and environmental monitoring

USVs are valuable in oceanography, as they are more manouevrable than moored or drifting weather buoys, but far cheaper than the equivalent weather ships and research vessels, and more flexible than commercial-ship contributions.  USVs used in oceanographic research tend to be powered and propelled by renewable energy sources. For example, Wave gliders harness wave energy for primary propulsion, whereas Saildrones and Sailbuoys use wind. Other USVs harness solar energy to power electric motors, such as Data Xplorer; a product of Open Ocean Robotics, and Xocean. Renewable-powered and persistent, ocean-going USVs have solar cells to power their electronics. Renewable-powered USV persistence are typically measured in months. 

As of 2022, USVs have been predominantly used for environmental monitoring and hydrographic survey and future uptake is likely to grow in monitoring and surveillance of very remote locations due to their potential for multidisciplinary use. Low operational cost has been a consistent driver for USV uptake when compared with crewed vessels. Other drivers for USV uptake have change through time, including reducing risk to people, spatio-temporal efficiency, endurance, precision and accessing very shallow water.

Non-renewable-powered USVs are a powerful tool for use in commercial hydrographic survey. Using a small USV in parallel to traditional survey vessels as a 'force-multiplier' can double survey coverage and reduce time on-site. This method was used for a survey carried out in the Bering Sea, off Alaska; the ASV Global 'C-Worker 5' autonomous surface vehicle (ASV) collected 2,275 nautical miles of survey, 44% of the project total. This was a first for the survey industry and resulted in a saving of 25 days at sea.

Saildrone

A saildrone is a type of unmanned surface vehicle used primarily in oceans for data collection. Saildrones are wind and solar powered and carry a suite of science sensors and navigational instruments. They can follow a set of remotely prescribed waypoints. The saildrone was invented by Richard Jenkins, a British engineer, founder and CEO of Saildrone, Inc. Saildrones have been used by scientists and research organizations like the National Oceanic and Atmospheric Administration (NOAA) to survey the marine ecosystem, fisheries, and weather. In January 2019, a small fleet of saildrones was launched to attempt the first autonomous circumnavigation of Antarctica. One of the  saildrones completed the mission, traveling  over the seven month journey while collecting a detailed data set using on board environmental monitoring instrumentation.

In August 2019, SD 1021 completed the fastest unmanned Atlantic crossing sailing from Bermuda to the UK, and in October, it completed the return trip to become the first autonomous vehicle to cross the Atlantic in both directions. The University of Washington and the Saildrone company began a joint venture in 2019 called The Saildrone Pacific Sentinel Experiment, which positioned six saildrones along the west coast of the United States to gather atmospheric and ocean data.

Saildrone and NOAA deployed five modified hurricane-class vessels at key locations in the Atlantic Ocean prior to the June start of the 2021 hurricane season. In September, SD 1045 was in location to obtain video and data from inside Hurricane Sam. It was the first research vessel to ever venture into the middle of a major hurricane.

Military applications

Military applications for USVs include powered seaborne targets and minehunting, as well as surveillance and reconnaissance, strike operations, and area denial or sea denial.

In 2016 DARPA launched an anti-submarine USV prototype called Sea Hunter. Turkish firm Aselsan produced ALBATROS-T and ALBATROS-K moving target boats for the Turkish Naval Forces to use in shooting drills. Turkey's first indigenously developed armed USV (AUSV) is the ULAQ, developed by Ares Shipyard, Meteksan Defence Systems and Roketsan. ULAQ is armed with 4 Roketsan Cirit and 2 UMTAS. It completed its first firing test successfully on 27 May 2021. The ULAQ can be deployed from combat ships. It can be controlled remotely from mobile vehicles, headquarters, command centers and floating platforms. It will serve in missions such as reconnaissance, surveillance and intelligence, surface warfare, asymmetric warfare, armed escort, force protection, and strategic facility security. Ares Shipyard's CEO says that very different versions of ULAQ equipped with different weapons are under development. Its primary user will be Turkish Naval Forces.

In addition, military applications for medium unmanned surface vessels (MUSVs) include fleet intelligence, surveillance, reconnaissance and electronic warfare. In August 2020, L3Harris Technologies was awarded a contract to build an MUSV prototype, with options for up to nine vessels. L3Harris subcontracted Swiftships, a Louisiana-based shipbuilder, to build the vessels, with displacement of about 500 tons. The prototype is targeted for completion by end of 2022. It is the first unmanned naval platform programme in this class of ships, which will likely play a major role in supporting the Distributed Maritime Operations strategy of the U.S. Navy. Earlier, Swiftships partnered with University of Louisiana in 2014 to build the Anaconda (AN-1) and later the Anaconda (AN-2) class of small USVs.

On 13 April 2022, the US sent unspecified "unmanned coastal defense vessels" to Ukraine amid the 2022 Russian invasion of Ukraine as part of a new security package.

A theory about the Crimean Bridge explosion was put forward by the BBC that a unmanned surface vehicle was used in it.

Use in combat 
On 29 October 2022, during the Russian invasion of Ukraine, Ukrainian armed forces made a multi-USV attack on Russian naval vessels at the Sevastopol Naval Base. According to the Russian Defense Ministry, seven USVs were involved in the attack with support of eight UAVs. This represents the first use of unmanned surface vehicles in naval warfare. Naval News reported that little damage had occurred to either of the two warships that were hit by the small USVs, a Russian frigate and a minesweeper. However, the military effect of the attack on the protected harbor of Sevastopol exceeded the direct damage because it led to the Russian Navy going into a protective mode, "essentially locking them in port. ... New defenses were quickly added, new procedures imposed and there was much less activity. Russia’s most powerful warships in the war [were by mid-November] mostly tied up in port." The US Naval Institute reported that, by December 2022, the "Russian Navy now knows it is vulnerable in its main naval base, causing it to retreat further into its shell, increasing defenses and reducing activity outside."
A second USV attack occurred in mid-November in Novorossiysk, also in the Black Sea but much further from Russian occupied territory than Sevastopol.

Later in the war, SpaceX restricted the licensing of its Starlink satellite-internet communication technology, excluding direct military use on weapon systems after January 2023. The limitation restricted use of the USV design used by Ukraine in late 2022. At the same time, Russia increased its capabilities in small explosive USVs and used one to ram a bridge on 10 February 2023. The new Russian capability with USVs, and the communication restrictions on the previous Ukrainian USVs, could change the balance in the naval war. In the view of Naval News, "The Black Sea appears to be becoming more Russian friendly again."

Cargo

In the future, many unmanned cargo ships are expected to cross the waters. In November 2021, the first autonomous cargo ship, MV Yara Birkeland was launched in Norway. The fully electric ship is expected to substantially reduce the need for truck journeys.

Urban vessels and small-scale logistics
In 2021, the world's first urban autonomous vessels, Roboats, were deployed in the canals of Amsterdam, Netherlands. The ships developed by three institutions could carry up to five people, collect waste, deliver goods, monitor the environment and provide "on-demand infrastructure".

Seaweed farming
Unmanned surface vehicles can also assist in seaweed farming and help to reduce operating costs.

See also

 Self-steering gear
 Spartan Scout
 Swarm robotics
 USV RSV (Marine Tech)

References

 
Oceanographic instrumentation